Gesine Ruge is a German sprint canoer who has competed since the mid-2000s. She won three medals at the ICF Canoe Sprint World Championships with a gold (K-2 1000 m: 2007) and two bronzes (K-2 500 m: 2006, K-4 1000 m: 2007).

References

German female canoeists
Living people
Year of birth missing (living people)
ICF Canoe Sprint World Championships medalists in kayak